Coroner is a Canadian police procedural crime drama television series. Developed by Morwyn Brebner, the series is based on the Jenny Cooper crime novels by M. R. Hall. Serinda Swan stars as coroner Jenny Cooper. Coroner premiered on CBC on 7 January 2019.

Overview 
The series stars Serinda Swan as Jenny Cooper, a recently widowed coroner in Toronto who investigates suspicious deaths.

Cast and characters

Main

 Serinda Swan as Jenny Cooper (seasons 1–4)
 Roger Cross as Det. Donovan "Mac" McAvoy
 Alli Chung as Det. Taylor Kim (season 1)
 Andy McQueen as Det. Malik Abed
 Éric Bruneau as Liam Bouchard (seasons 1–3; guest season 4)
 Nicholas Campbell as Gordon Cooper
 Ehren Kassam as Ross Kalighi
 Lovell Adams-Gray as Dr. Dwayne Allen (season 1; guest season 2)
 Tamara Podemski as Alison Trent (seasons 1–3)
 Kiley May as River Baitz (season 2–present; recurring season 1)
 Olunike Adeliyi as Noor Armias (season 2)
 Mark Taylor as Clark Coleman (season 3; guest season 4)
 Uni Park as Dr. Melanie Lum-Davis (season 3)
 Jon De Leon as Dennis Garcia (season 4; recurring season 3)
 Thom Allison as Dr. Elijah Thompson (season 4)

Recurring

 Saad Siddiqui as Dr. Neil Sharma (seasons 1–3)
 Nicola Correia-Damude as Kelly Hart (season 2)
 Jonathan Tan as Dr. Luca Cheng (season 3–present)
 Sarah Podemski as Kirima Rite (season 3–present)
 Jennifer Dale as Peggy, Jenny's Mom and Gordon's wife (season 3–4)

Production and development 
Coroner was developed for television by Morwyn Brebner from M. R. Hall's series of crime novels, and produced by Muse Entertainment, Back Alley Film Productions, and Cineflix Studios, with Adrienne Mitchell as executive producer and lead director.

The first season consists of eight episodes. Following the finale of the first season, CBC renewed Coroner for an eight-episode second season on 25 March 2019. The third season was announced on 26 May 2020, and premiered on 3 February 2021.

On 2 June 2021, CBC announced the series had been renewed for a fourth season. Production began on the 12-episode fourth season in July 2021, and in November it was announced that the fourth season was scheduled to premiere on 6 January 2022.

In June 2022, Sally Catto, CBC General Manager, announced that Serinda Swan had decided to leave the series, and options were being discussed with its producers.

Series overview

Season 1 (2019)

Season 2 (2020)

Season 3 (2021)

Season 4 (2022)

Release 
Coroner premiered on CBC on 7 January 2019, and attracted more than 1 million viewers per episode throughout the first season. The series was subsequently renewed for a second season. Season 2 premiered on 6 January 2020; followed by Season 3 on February 3, 2021. The fourth season premiered on 6 January 2022.

In September 2018, Cineflix Rights acquired the global distribution rights to Coroner.

In October 2018, NBCUniversal International Networks acquired Coroner from Cineflix Rights for their channels in the UK, Germany, France, Spain, Poland, Africa, Latin America, Brazil and Australia.

Season 1 premiered in the United Kingdom on Universal TV on 21 January 2019. Cineflix announced that the broadcast of Coroner in the UK was Universal TV's strongest ever series launch. After the shut down of Universal TV in January 2020 with the takeover of Sky Group by Comcast and the subsequent merger of operations, Season 2 premiered in the UK on Sky Witness on 29 July 2020. Season 3 premiered on 22 February 2021.

UK's Channel 4 acquired the first and second seasons in May 2020 and began broadcasting the series on the More4 channel on 6 May 2021.

In the United States, The CW acquired the broadcast rights to the series in June 2020. Coroner premiered in the U.S. on 5 August 2020.  Season 2 premiered on 7 October 2020. The third season premiered on 19 August 2021. In July 2022, The CW announced the premiere of season 4 on October 2 at 9 p.m.

Notes

References

External links
 Coroner at CBC Television
 Coroner at CBC Gem
 Coroner at Cineflix
  Coroner at The CW
 
 

2019 Canadian television series debuts
2010s Canadian crime drama television series
2020s Canadian crime drama television series
Canadian mystery television series
Canadian police procedural television series
Detective television series
English-language television shows
Television shows about death
Television shows based on British novels
Television shows filmed in Toronto
Television shows set in Toronto
Television series by Muse Entertainment
Television series by Cineflix
CBC Television original programming